Silverside may refer to:
 Silverside (beef), a cut of beef
 Silverside (fish), the Atheriniformes, an order of fish
 Agnes Silverside (died 1557), one of the Colchester Martyrs
 USS Silversides, the name of 2 U.S. Navy submarines
 Silverside, nickname of early Greyhound Lines buses
 Silverside, Delaware, a place in the U.S.

See also

Silverback